Demir Ramović (born 3 January 1982), also known as ramovicOAK, is a Montenegrin eFootball player and former footballer who played as a midfielder. He represented Montenegro at the UEFA eEURO 2020.

Club career
Ramović started out at his hometown club Jedinstvo Bijelo Polje, before transferring to Sartid Smederevo in the summer of 2000. He spent five years with the club, winning the Serbia and Montenegro Cup in the 2002–03 season. In 2005, Ramović moved to Bosnia and Herzegovina and signed with Premier League side Zrinjski Mostar.

In the summer of 2006, Ramović returned to Montenegro, shortly after the country declared its independence, and rejoined Jedinstvo Bijelo Polje for the inaugural 2006–07 Montenegrin First League. He later briefly played for Rudar Pljevlja, before returning to Jedinstvo. In early 2009, Ramović joined fellow First League club Dečić.

International career
Ramović represented FR Yugoslavia at the 2001 UEFA European Under-18 Championship, as the team lost to Spain in the third-place match.

Statistics

Honours
Sartid Smederevo
 Serbia and Montenegro Cup: 2002–03

References

External links
 
 
 
 
 
 ramovicOAK at ESL Gaming
 ramovicOAK at HFP Gaming

1982 births
Living people
People from Bijelo Polje
Association football midfielders
Serbia and Montenegro footballers
Montenegrin footballers
FK Jedinstvo Bijelo Polje players
FK Smederevo players
HŠK Zrinjski Mostar players
FK Rudar Pljevlja players
FK Dečić players
First League of Serbia and Montenegro players
Premier League of Bosnia and Herzegovina players
Montenegrin First League players
Serbia and Montenegro expatriate footballers
Expatriate footballers in Bosnia and Herzegovina
Serbia and Montenegro expatriate sportspeople in Bosnia and Herzegovina